The 1961 Intercontinental Cup was a football match between Uruguayan club Peñarol, winners of the 1961 Copa Libertadores, and Portuguese club Benfica, winners of the 1960–61 European Cup. Peñarol won the Intercontinental Cup for the first time.

A play-off was needed due to the rules at the time that awarded 2 points for each victory and both teams having won one game each.

Qualified teams

Match details

First leg

Second leg

Play-off 

|valign="top"| 
|valign="top" width="50%"|

|}

See also
1960–61 European Cup
1961 Copa Libertadores
S.L. Benfica in international football

References

Intercontinental Cup
Intercontinental Cup
Intercontinental Cup
Intercontinental Cup 1961
Intercontinental Cup 1961
Intercontinental Cup (football)
International club association football competitions hosted by Portugal
International club association football competitions hosted by Uruguay
Intercontinental Cup
September 1961 sports events in Europe
Sports competitions in Lisbon
Sports competitions in Montevideo
1960s in Lisbon
1960s in Montevideo
September 1961 sports events in South America